Duguay-Trouin is a F67 type large high-sea frigate of the French Marine Nationale specialised in anti-submarine warfare, though it also had anti-air and anti-surface capabilities. She was the 10th French vessel named after the 17th century privateer René Duguay-Trouin.

She was decommissioned on 13 July 1999 and was used as a harbour wave-breaker protection. On 3 July 2020, the vessel arrived at the breakers in Ghent, Belgium.

Tourville-class frigates
Cold War frigates of France
Frigates of France
Ships built in France
1973 ships